Rewadih  is a village in  Rajnandgaon district of Chhattisgarh state of India.

References

Villages in Rajnandgaon district